Miguel Gianpierre Araujo Blanco (born 24 October 1994) is a Peruvian professional footballer who plays as a centre-back for Eredivisie club Emmen and the Peru national team.

Club career

Cobresol
Miguel Araujo started his senior career by joining Cobresol's first team on 13 July 2011. Then on 5 November 2011, at the age of 17, he made his league debut in the Torneo Descentralizado in matchday 27 away to Universidad César Vallejo.  Araujo was included in the starting line-up by manager Teddy Cardama and was later changed for Jaime La Torre in stoppage time as the match finished in a 1–0 win for Vallejo.
In his next match he played as a starter again in his side's 1–1 at home draw against Universitario de Deportes for matchday 28.  He played the following matches as a starter and recorded his first win for his side in the 3–1 win over Colegio Nacional Iquitos for matchday 30.

Sport Huancayo
Arauho left Cobresol to join Sport Huancayo in January 2012. He played over 40 league matches with Sport Huancayo before making his move to Europe.

Red Star Belgrade
On 29 July 2013, he signed a four-year contract with Serbian club Red Star Belgrade and was assigned the number 20 on his jersey.  He made his debut for the club in a 5–1 win over Novi Pazar on 19 October 2013, with manager Slaviša Stojanović describing his performance as "solid".

Alianza
Since his return from Serbia, Araujo has become regular in Alianza Lima in the following seasons.

International career
Araujo was part of the Peru U17 national team that finished fourth at the 2011 South American Under-17 Football Championship and in the Peru U20 team at the 2013 South American Youth Championship.

On 27 March 2013, he received a call-up to the Peru senior national team for a match against Trinidad and Tobago. He made his debut for Peru on 18 November 2014, in a friendly match against Paraguay.

In June 2018, he was named in Peru’s 23-man squad for the 2018 World Cup in Russia.

Career statistics

Honours
Red Star
Serbian SuperLiga: 2013–14

References

1994 births
Living people
Footballers from Lima
Association football defenders
Peruvian footballers
Peru international footballers
Cobresol FBC footballers
Sport Huancayo footballers
Peruvian Primera División players
Red Star Belgrade footballers
Club Alianza Lima footballers
Talleres de Córdoba footballers
FC Emmen players
Serbian SuperLiga players
Argentine Primera División players
Eredivisie players
Peruvian expatriate footballers
Expatriate footballers in Serbia
Expatriate footballers in Argentina
Expatriate footballers in the Netherlands
Peru under-20 international footballers
2018 FIFA World Cup players
2019 Copa América players
2021 Copa América players